Maria Mokh (born 4 November 1990) is a Russian former professional tennis player.

She has career-high WTA rankings of 359 in singles, achieved on 10 August 2009, and 435 in doubles, attained on 14 July 2008.

Mokh has reached two singles finals on the ITF Circuit posting a 1–1 record. Additionally, she has reached eight doubles finals on the ITF Circuit with a record of 2–6.

Career
Mokh made her WTA Tour debut at the 2008 Bell Challenge in Quebec City, Canada where she advanced through the qualifying rounds to reach her first main draw. In qualifying, she defeated Jennifer Elie 6–4, 6–2, Mara Santangelo 6–4, 3–6, 7–6(10–8) and Angela Haynes 6–4, 6–3. In the first round, she lost to the top seed and eventual champion, Nadia Petrova, in straight sets 1–6, 2–6.

In 2009, she participated in the European Universities Tennis Championships competing for Moscow State University of Economics, Statistics, and Informatics, where they finished in second place in the women's bracket, runners-up to the team from Czech Republic representing the Technical University of Ostrava.

ITF Circuit finals

Singles: 2 (1 title, 1 runner-up)

Doubles: 8 (2 titles, 6 runner-ups)

References

External links
 
 

1990 births
Living people
Russian female tennis players
20th-century Russian women
21st-century Russian women